Monte delle Tre Croci is a mountain on the border between Liguria and Piedmont, northern Italy, part of the Ligurian Apennines.  It has a summit elevation of 1,565 metres.

References

Mountains of Liguria
Mountains of Piedmont
One-thousanders of Italy
Mountains of the Apennines